Griffis or Griffiss is a surname. Notable people with the surname include:

Elliot Griffis, composer
William Elliot Griffis, orientalist
Townsend Griffiss, aviator

See also
16253 Griffis, asteroid
Griffiss International Airport, in Rome, New York
Griffis Sculpture Park, in Cattaraugus County, New York